Senorita Justice is a 2004 film directed by Kantz. It is one of the first features from the low-budget production house Breakaway Films.

Plot  

Anna Rios (Yancy Mendia) is a young lawyer who negotiates property agreements in the city of Miami. Anna learns that her younger brother was murdered in a gang-related drive-by attack and learns that her father had emotionally broken down. Not capable of opposing the call of her home, she proceeds to the seedy streets where she was raised to look into the subject. She takes a sabbatical from work, and heads back to the pollo frito she once knew, sending her father on vacation so she can get down to business. It isn't long before Anna enlists the help of a transgender nymphomaniac childhood friend, named Vanessa (Mirtha Michelle), and rekindles an old flame, named Hector (Kalex), all in the name of avenging her murdered brother.

During Anna's investigation she meets two female cops, Detective Edith Garcia (Edith González) and Detective Roselyn Martinez (Eva Longoria) who are investigating her brother's murder, but are renowned less for their detection skills. Both Garcia and Martinez become persuaded into believing that one of Anna's childhood friends, Hector, witnessed the slaying. He, however, is unwilling to cooperate. That evening, Anna changes her expensive clothing into street clothes and embarks on a personal quest to find her brother's killers as a self-proclaimed vigilante going by her street name "Señorita Justice".

Anna's search for the killers lead her to a sleazy gang leader named Mo (Michael Francis) who turns out to be under the thumb of a greedy local businessman, named Manny Sanchez (Tito Puente Jr.) whom is determined to instigate a gang war to drive them out of the neighborhood for a real estate business. Anna eventually finds herself in over-her-head when she gets pursued not only by Detective Garcia, but also Mo's gang members, and a ruthless female Yakuza assassin. When Mo is killed in a similar drive-by shooting, Anna thinks that she has been looking in the wrong place and focuses her attention on Hector who admits to her that he was with her brother that night, but thinks that HE was the target, not her brother.

When Hector makes plans with Anna to leave the neighborhood, he too is gunned down in a drive-by shooting which fills Anna with grief and rage. Thinking that Manny Sanchez is behind it, Anna teams up with Vanessa where they abduct Manny as he is leaving his office and try to get him to confess. But Anna is betrayed by Vanessa who reveals that she was the one who killed her brother. Vanessa admits that Hector was the target for he was investigating Manny, plus he was also romantically involved with Vanessa. But Anna manages to talk Vanessa into lowering her gun, in which she turns the gun on herself and commits suicide by shooting herself out of guilt. Anna forces Manny to take her to a seedy motel where the two thugs he hired to terrorize the neighborhood and whom killed Hector are residing. Anna breaks into their room and kills both of them in a quick shootout, as well as Manny.

Anna goes back to her law office building where she confronts her former boss, Charles Adams, who has been working behind the scenes to orchestrate this whole thing. When Anna tries to shoot him, she is attacked by Chiba, the brutal Japanese assassin sent from Japan to kill her. After a climatic and brutal fistfight between the two women in the lobby of the building, Anna gets the upper hand and kills the female Yakuza by slashing her neck with her cross necklace that she wears around her neck. Relieved but exhausted, Anna is only confronted by Charles, pointing a gun at her. Before he can shoot Anna, Detective Garcia runs in and shoots him dead.

In the final scene, Detectives Garcia and Martinez arrive at Anna's house to thank her for solving the case for them. Anna tells them that she has decided to stay in her old neighborhood and live with her father when he returns, and that she will open up her own law practice to help those less fortunate then her. Garcia thanks Anna for her help, but also tells her to stay out of trouble. When the two women detectives leave to respond to a call, Anna gets out her street clothes from her suitcase, implying that she will intend to continue her second lifestyle of fighting crime as Señorita Justice.

Principal cast 
Yancy Mendia .... Anna Rios
Mirtha Michelle ....  Vanessa Ortiz
Kalax .... Hector Fernandez
Michael Francis .... Mo Gutierez
Edith González .... Detective Christine Garcia
Eva Longoria .... Detective Roselyn Martinez
Tito Puente Jr. .... Manny Sanchez
Angelo Fierro ....  Carlos Rios
Luis Garaza .... Charles Adams
Felix Sama .... Freddy Lopez
James De La Raza .... Lenny Lopez
Grayce Wey .... Chiba

External links
MSN Movies
DVD Direct
 

2005 films
2000s English-language films
Hood films